The Abell S740 is a cluster of galaxies identified in the Abell catalogue of southern rich clusters of galaxies. It is over 450 Mly away in the constellation Centaurus. It has a redshift of 10,073 km/s.

See also
 Abell catalogue
 List of Abell clusters

References

Abell S0740
Abell S0740
S0740
Abell richness class 0